Maja Stankovska (born 13 January 1988) is a Macedonian footballer who plays as a forward for the North Macedonia national team.

International career
Stankovska made her debut for the North Macedonia national team on 19 September 2009, against Slovakia.

References

1988 births
Living people
Women's association football forwards
Macedonian women's footballers
North Macedonia women's international footballers